Ishaan Khatter (born 1 November 1995) is an Indian actor who works in Hindi films. The son of actors Rajesh Khattar and Neelima Azeem, he made his first screen appearance as a child in the 2005 film Vaah! Life Ho Toh Aisi!, which starred his half-brother Shahid Kapoor.

Khatter had his first leading role in Majid Majidi's drama Beyond the Clouds (2017), in which his performance as a drug dealer won him the Filmfare Award for Best Male Debut. His first commercial success came with the romantic drama Dhadak (2018), and he has since starred in the British miniseries A Suitable Boy (2020).

Early life and background
Khatter is the son of actors Neelima Azeem and Rajesh Khattar. His half-brother, Shahid Kapoor, is Azeem's son from her first marriage to actor Pankaj Kapur. Khatter describes himself as someone who is proud of his middle class values. He explains that he grew up in a household rich in culture, cinema, and the performing arts, and that he worked towards developing himself as an artiste. Khatter was educated at Jamnabai Narsee School and Billabong High International School, Juhu in Mumbai. He also studied dance at Shiamak Davar's academy.

After making his first screen appearance as a child in the 2005 film Vaah! Life Ho Toh Aisi!, starring Kapoor, Khatter worked as an assistant director to Abhishek Chaubey on his film Udta Punjab (2016) and Danish Renzu on the independent film Half Widow (2017).

Career

Khatter's first acting role as an adult came with Beyond the Clouds (2017), directed by Majid Majidi, in which he played Amir, a drug dealer. It premiered at the BFI London Film Festival and was released theatrically in 2018. Reviewing the film for The Hollywood Reporter, Deborah Young wrote that Khatter's "noteworthy screen charisma promises well for his future career". He won the Best Actor award at the 5th International Bosphorous Film Festival and the Filmfare Award for Best Male Debut.

Khatter next played the lead role in Shashank Khaitan's romantic drama Dhadak (2018), a remake of the Marathi film Sairat (2016), co-starring newcomer Janhvi Kapoor. It tells the story of two young lovers in rural Rajasthan who face political opposition to their relationship due to caste discrimination. Uday Bhatia of Mint criticized Dhadak for lacking the depth of the original film, but found "a soulfulness to [Khatter] that's at odds with Hindi cinema's current penchant for bratty, hyperactive onscreen male personas". Shubhra Gupta of The Indian Express too disliked the film, but labelled Khatter a "natural" performer and took note of his "mobile, expressive face".

In 2020, Khatter starred in the British miniseries A Suitable Boy, Mira Nair's adaptation of Vikram Seth's novel of the same name, in which he was paired opposite Tabu. It aired in six parts on BBC One. He was drawn to the project due to its depiction of an older woman-young man romance, which he hoped would challenge social stigma of such relationships. Hugo Rifkind of The Times found Khatter to be "suitably charismatic and dangerous" in his part. That same year, he starred alongside Ananya Panday in the action film Khaali Peeli, which due to COVID-19 pandemic was released digitally on Zee Plex.

In 2022, Khatter featured alongside Katrina Kaif and Siddhant Chaturvedi in the comedy horror film Phone Bhoot. Reviewers were generally unimpressed with the picture, but Saibal Chatterjee of NDTV thought that the "charm and spunk" that Khatter brought to his comic role enabled him to "[walk] away with the film". The following year, he started in a promotional short film for Apple Inc., titled Fursat, directed by Vishal Bhardwaj on an iPhone 14 Pro.

Khatter will next star as an army tank commander in the war film Pippa, about the Indo-Pakistani War of 1971.

Media 
Khatter was ranked in The Times Most Desirable Men at No. 27 in 2018, at No. 32 in 2019, at No. 25 in 2020.

Filmography

Films

Web series

Awards and nominations

References

External links 

 
 
 

1995 births
Khatter, Ishaan
Indian male film actors
Male actors in Hindi cinema
Male actors from Mumbai
Filmfare Awards winners
Screen Awards winners
International Indian Film Academy Awards winners
Zee Cine Awards winners